Obersontheim is a municipality in the district of Schwäbisch Hall in Baden-Württemberg in Germany.

Today the town includes a number of villages, including Untersontheim, Ummenhofen and Hausen.

References

Schwäbisch Hall (district)